Stephen J. Ache (March 16, 1962 - September 20, 2022) was a former American football player who played as a linebacker. Born in Syracuse, New York, he attended Southwest Missouri State before playing in the National Football League (NFL) for the Minnesota Vikings during the 1987 NFLPA strike. He never lost a game in high school attending Mascoutah high school in Mascoutah, Illinois where he played linebacker. At Vanden high school in Sacramento, California he played linebacker and quarterback.

References

1962 births
Living people
Players of American football from Syracuse, New York
American football linebackers
Missouri State Bears football players
Minnesota Vikings players
National Football League replacement players